Jeff Glass (born April 21, 1962 in London, Ontario) was a Canadian professional hurdler.  Glass competed in the 1984 Summer Olympics, ranking eighth in the 110 metres hurdles.

References

External links
 

1962 births
Athletes (track and field) at the 1983 Pan American Games
Athletes (track and field) at the 1984 Summer Olympics
Canadian male hurdlers
Living people
Olympic track and field athletes of Canada
Pan American Games track and field athletes for Canada
Athletes (track and field) at the 1986 Commonwealth Games
Commonwealth Games competitors for Canada
Athletes from London, Ontario